Estradiol benzoate/hydroxyprogesterone caproate (EB/OHPC), sold under the brand name Primosiston among others, is a combined estrogen and progestogen medication which is used to treat gynecological disorders and habitual abortion. It contains estradiol benzoate (EB), an estrogen, and hydroxyprogesterone caproate (OHPC), a progestin. The medication is given by injection into muscle.

Medical uses
EB/OHPC is used in the treatment of gynecological disorders such as menstrual disorders (e.g., amenorrhea, dysfunctional uterine bleeding) and premenstrual syndrome, habitual abortion (threatened miscarriage), and for other indications.

Available forms
EB/OHPC is available in the form of ampoules of oil solutions containing 10 mg estradiol benzoate (EB) and 125 to 250 mg hydroxyprogesterone caproate (OHPC).

History
EB/OHPC was first introduced for medical use in 1955.

Society and culture

Brand names
EB/OHPC has been marketed under brand names including Dos Dias N, Lutes, Ostrolut, Primosiston (or Primosiston Inj. / Injection), Primosiston Fuerte, and Syngynon.

Availability
EB/OHPC has been mostly discontinued and hence is mostly no longer available. It remains marketed under the brand names Primosiston in Ecuador and Peru, Dos Dias N in Argentina, and Lutes in Japan. It was previously marketed under the brand names Ostrolut in Austria; Primosiston (or Primosiston Inj. / Injection) (Schering) in Argentina, Germany, Mexico, Switzerland, and Venezuela; Primosiston Fuerte in Spain; and Syngynon in Germany, but these formulations have all been discontinued and hence are no longer available in these countries.

See also
 Estradiol dipropionate/hydroxyprogesterone caproate
 Estradiol valerate/hydroxyprogesterone caproate
 Estradiol benzoate/progesterone
 List of combined sex-hormonal preparations

References

Combined estrogen–progestogen formulations